Matthew John Dalby FRSE is Professor of Cell Engineering at the University of Glasgow. His research is focused on mesenchymal stem cell interactions with nanotopography, with particular focus on the use of metabolomics, to study mechanotransduction.

He was part of a team, led by Prof Manuel Salmeron-Sanchez, who developed bone growth technology that was used in Eva the Large Münsterländer to save her leg from amputation.

He completed his PhD in Biomedical Materials at Queen Mary University of London in 2001. He has an h-index of 70.

References

External links

1972 births
Living people
Alumni of Queen Mary University of London
Academics of the University of Glasgow
Fellows of the Royal Society of Edinburgh